Geriatric oncology is a branch of medicine that is concerned with the diagnosis and treatment of cancer in the elderly, usually defined as aged 65 and older.  This fairly young but increasingly important subspecialty incorporates the special needs of the elderly into the treatment of cancer.

In the last few years, this particular subspecialty has received a lot of attention.  A large proportion of the population of developed countries are aging.  In the United States, 20% of the population will be older than 65 years of age by the year 2030.  Those 85 years and older will be the most rapidly growing group.  This is compounded by the fact that the majority of cancer patients will be in this age group.  Age in itself is one of the most important risk factors for developing cancer.  Currently, 60% of newly diagnosed malignant tumors and 70% of cancer deaths occur in people aged 65 years or older.  Many cancers are linked to aging; these include breast, colorectal, prostate, pancreatic, lung, bladder and stomach cancers.

Because most non-pediatric cancer patients are older, there is a saying that all oncologists who are not pediatric oncologists are geriatric oncologists.

Unique concerns of older cancer patients 
For many reasons, older adults with cancer have different needs than younger adults with the disease. For example, older adults:  
 May be less able to tolerate certain cancer treatments.
 Have a decreased reserve (the capacity to respond to disease and treatment).
 May have other medical problems in addition to cancer.
 May have functional problems, such as the ability to do basic activities (dressing, bathing, eating) or more advanced activities (such as using transportation, going shopping or handling finances).
 May not always have access to transportation, social support or financial resources.
 May have different views of quality versus quantity of life

Clinical trials usually exclude the elderly, and therefore, guidelines for treatment of cancer were mainly based on the younger population. A lot of research in this area is needed.

Just as a child would see a pediatrician for medical care, an older patient should go to a geriatrician. An older patient with cancer will benefit from the expertise of a geriatric oncologist. Older patients have unique needs because of their often complex medical histories, numerous drugs they are taking, their social situations, possible problems with cognitive dysfunction related to age, and general diminution of organ function that occurs naturally in the older population. For these reasons, it is important that older patients (especially if frail, or have multiple medical problems) being considered for cancer treatment should undergo comprehensive geriatric assessment, to take all these factors into account.

Origins 
Rosemary Yancik first organized a symposium on geriatric oncology sponsored by the National Cancer Institute and the National Institute on Aging. A 1988 ASCO Presidential Address published in the Journal of Clinical Oncology by Dr. B.J. Kennedy encouraged the study of aging and cancer.

The American Society of Clinical Oncology (ASCO) has played a vital role in promoting the field of geriatric oncology in the United States. B.J. Kennedy, MD was one of the fathers of this field.  In the late 1980s, the ASCO Annual Meetings started including educational sessions and presentations pertaining to this field.  The Journal of Clinical Oncology started publishing more articles pertaining to geriatric oncology.  ASCO has also funded training for oncology fellows.

One of a handful of people around the world who created the field of geriatric oncology during the 1980s was Lodovico Balducci. He was co-editor of the first major medial textbook on the subject, Geriatric Oncology, published in 1982, and has been honored with the B.J. Kennedy Award for Scientific Excellence in Geriatric Oncology from the American Society of Clinical Oncology.

Training and education programs 
Training programs specifically in the geriatric oncology subspeciality have been established.  In the United States, the ASCO Geriatric Oncology Fellowship program was developed with funding from the John A. Hartford Foundation. The American Board of Internal Medicine approved a 3-year combined fellowship training program in medical oncology and geriatrics.  Graduates of this program will be eligible to be board certified in both specialties.  Some fellows opt to also obtain additional training and certification in hematology as well.  10 institutions were identified and a curriculum was designed and instituted.

An example of a geriatric oncology fellowship training curriculum can be found here.

Internationally, a diploma in geriatric oncology has now been established in France.

The first textbook in the field, Geriatric Oncology, was published by Lodovico Balducci et al.  There are now many others.

Assessment 
Typically, new patients meet with either a geriatric oncologist (or sometimes a medical oncologist and geriatrician separately), a psychosocial professional, and a nutritionist, all of whom work together to provide a comprehensive geriatric assessment of the patient's fitness to withstand the therapy necessary to treat his or her cancer. A number of validated screening tools are recommended have been identified to aid this process. Following the initial assessment, the team meets to evaluate the patient's fitness for therapy. The team's decisions and recommendations are then presented to the patient and his or her family as well as to the patient's primary physician when appropriate. After these discussions, and ideally with shared decision-making, treatment for the patient's cancer is decided on and initiated.

Organization and societies 
The Geriatric Oncology Consortium is a non-profit organization dedicated to addressing the age based disparities in research, education and treatment in the older adult cancer population. It is leader in developing and conducting research in older adults and  providing older adult cancer education to medical professionals, patients, caregivers and the general public.

The American Society of Clinical Oncology (ASCO) has started a geriatric oncology subspeciality. A webpage dedicated to article and resources about geriatric oncology is available.

The World oncology network has established a directory for geriatric oncology to promote this subspeciality.

The International Society of Geriatric Oncology or Société Internationale d'Oncologie Gériatrique in French, hence the acronym SIOG, was founded in 2000 and was officially registered as a Not-for-profit organisation under the Swiss law in October 2012. SIOG is a multidisciplinary society, including physicians in the fields of oncology and geriatrics, and allied health professionals and has over 1000 members in more than 40 countries around the world.
The major risk factor for cancer is age, and with the aging of the world population, a major epidemiologic challenge is before us.

The goal of SIOG is to foster the development of health professionals in the field of geriatric oncology, in order to optimize treatment of older adults with cancer.
SIOG promotes efforts in 3 strategic directions:

1. Education
 Disseminate knowledge in order to maintain a high common standard of healthcare in older cancer patients
 Integrate geriatric oncology in the curricula for medical and nursing education to ensure a high standard of qualification for healthcare professionals 
 Address the shortage of specialist oncologists/geriatricians & allied health staff in geriatric oncology 
 Increase public awareness of the worldwide cancer in the elderly epidemic
2. Clinical practice 
 Integrate geriatric evaluation (including co morbidities) into oncology decision-making and guidelines 
 Improve the quality of prevention, diagnosis, treatment, and follow-up of older patients with malignancies 
 Address issues of access to care, including the needs of the caregiver 
 Develop interdisciplinary geriatric oncology clinics
3. Research
 Develop, test and disseminate easy screening tools
 Create a clear and operational definition of vulnerability/frailty applicable to oncology 
 Increase the relevance of clinical trials for older patients 
 Improve research in the field of geriatric oncology 
 Promote multidisciplinary, basic/translational research on the interface of aging and cancer

References

External links 
 SIOG - International Society of Geriatric Oncology or Société Internationale d'Oncologie Gériatrique
 Management of Cancer in the Elderly
 Boston medical center Fellowship in Geriatric Oncology.
 Hackensack University Medical Center Geriatric Oncology Division
 Cleveland Clinic, Geriatric oncology clinic
 University of Chicago Medical Center Geriatric Oncology Clinic
 World oncology network, Geriatric oncology
 AACR Task Force on Aging and Cancer

Oncology
Geriatrics